Emil Poklitar (born 14 June 1939) is a retired German football striker.

While playing for SC Dynamo Berlin, he defected to West Berlin after a friendly match against Boldklubben af 1893 at Idrætsparken in Copenhagen on 13 August 1961.

References

1939 births
Living people
German footballers
SC Dynamo Berlin
Tennis Borussia Berlin players
Freiburger FC players
1. FC Saarbrücken players
Association football forwards
DDR-Oberliga players
1. FC Saarbrücken managers
East German defectors
People from Tulcea County
Romanian emigrants to Germany
East German emigrants to West Germany
German football managers
West German football managers
East German footballers
People from East Berlin